Accrington Academy is a mixed 11-18 Academy in Accrington, Lancashire. It has designated specialisms in Sports and Mathematics. It is situated in the centre of Accrington. Accrington St Christopher's C of E High is nearby to the west.

History
The school, run by United Learning, opened on 1 September 2008 on the site of the former Accrington Moorhead Sports College, itself the successor Moorhead High School which was the successor of the one-time Accrington High School for Girls. All pupils previously at Moorhead automatically transferred to the new school, which has had a sixth form provision from September 2009.

Former schools
Accrington Grammar School had around 500 boys and 100 in the sixth form in the 1970s. Accrington High School for Girls had around 600 girls. Accrington Moorhead High School was on Cromwell Avenue off Queen's Road West. The school was founded in 1895 on Blackburn Rd, Accrington as a 'Technical School' In 1968, it moved to the Moorhead site. In 1975, following the Labour government's educational reforms, it ceased to exist.

Notable former pupils

Accrington Moorhead Sports College
Dominic Brunt, actor, known for his part in Emmerdale as Paddy Kirk.

Accrington Grammar School

 Sir Kenneth Barnes CB, Permanent Secretary from 1976 to 1982 of the Department of Employment
 Jim Bowen, comedian, and former host of Bullseye
 Oliver Bulleid CBE, Chief Mechanical Engineer from 1937 to 1948 of the Southern Railway, and President from 1946 to 1947 of the Institution of Mechanical Engineers (IMechE), and assistant to Sir Nigel Gresley at the LNER works at Doncaster, helping to develop the LNER Class A4 and LNER Class P1
 Prof Wesley Cocker, developed methyl methacrylate for Perspex at ICI Dyestuffs at Blackley
 Harold Davenport FRS, mathematician, known for the Davenport–Schinzel sequence, Rouse Ball Professor of Mathematics from 1958 to 1969 at the University of Cambridge
 Sir James Drake CBE, civil engineer, designed the UK's first motorway when with Lancashire County Council
 Graeme Fowler, cricketer
 Harry Hill (cyclist)
 Ron Hill, marathon runner in the 1964 Tokyo and 1972 Munich Olympics, and won the gold at the 1970 Edinburgh Commonwealth Games
 Prof Leslie Howarth OBE, Henry Overton Wills Professor of Mathematics, University of Bristol (1964–76)
 Eric Kinder, Chairman from 1990 to 1997 and Chief Executive from 1982 to 1990 of Smith & Nephew
 Prof John Lamb CBE, James Watt Professor of Electrical Engineering from 1961 to 1991 at the University of Glasgow, President from 1970 to 1972 of the British Society of Rheology
 Bryan Langton CBE, Chairman and Chief Executive from 1990 to 1996 of Holiday Inn
 Rev Fred Lord, Editor from 1941 to 1956 of The Baptist Times
 James Prescott CBE, FRS, Professor of Agricultural Chemistry from 1924 to 1955 at the University of Adelaide and Director of the Waite Agricultural Research Institute (1938–55)
 Edward Slinger, judge and cricketer
 Sir John Tomlinson CBE, bass
 Prof John Wallwork CBE FRCS FMedSci, performed the first artificial heart transplant on 26 August 1994 at Papworth Hospital, Consultant Cardiothoracic Surgeon from 1981 to 2011 and Director of Transplantation from 1989 to 2006
 Graham Walne, theatre lighting designer
 Harry Yeadon, civil engineer, worked with James Drake on the UK's first motorway

Accrington High School for Girls
 Julie Hesmondhalgh, actress
 Gwen Mayor, primary school teacher who died at the Dunblane massacre
 Val Robinson OBE, played hockey for Great Britain
 Hazel Townson, children's author
 Jeanette Winterson, CBE, author

References

External links
 The New Academy Website
 EduBase

Schools in Hyndburn
Academies in Lancashire
United Learning schools
Educational institutions established in 2008
Secondary schools in Lancashire
Accrington
2008 establishments in England